A number of gemstones have gained fame, either because of their size and beauty or because of the people who owned or wore them.
A list of famous gemstones follows.

Alexandrites

Smithsonian museums' Alexandrite, the largest cut alexandrite weighing 65.08 carats.

Aquamarines

A birthstone.
The Dom Pedro – The world's largest cut and polished aquamarine. Housed in the permanent collection of the Houston Museum of Natural Science

Diamonds 
See List of diamonds

Emeralds

 Bahia Emerald
 Carolina Emperor, 310 carats uncut, 64.8 carats cut; discovered in the United States in 2009, resides in the North Carolina Museum of Natural Sciences, Raleigh
 Chalk Emerald
 Duke of Devonshire Emerald
 Emerald of Saint Louis, 51.60 carats cut; discovered in Austria, probably Habachtal, resides in the National Museum of Natural History, Paris
 Gachalá Emerald
 Mogul Mughal Emerald
 Patricia Emerald, 632 carats uncut, dihexagonal (12 sided); discovered in Colombia in 1920, resides in the American Museum of Natural History, New York

Opals
 The Andamooka Opal, presented to Queen Elizabeth II, also known as the Queen's Opal
 The Flame Queen Opal
 The Galaxy Opal
 The Glorious Jubilee
 The Halley's Comet Opal, the world's largest uncut black opal
 The Olympic Australis Opal, reported to be the largest and most valuable gem opal ever found

Pearls

Abernathy Pearl
Arco Valley Pearl
La Peregrina
The Pearl of Lao Tzu - Philippines
The Pearl of Puerto - Largest pearl
Servilia's pearl, most expensive pearl of all time

Rubies
The DeLong Star Ruby
The Midnight Star Ruby
The Neelanjali Ruby
The Rajaratna Ruby
The Rosser Reeves Ruby

Sapphires

The Logan Sapphire  
The Star of Bombay, given to Mary Pickford by Douglas Fairbanks, Sr
The Star of India
The Stuart Sapphire
The Black Star of Queensland
 The Star of Adam, with a weight of  The largest star sapphire in the world.
 The Queen Marie of Romania Sapphire

Spinels
The Black Prince's Ruby, actually a spinel mounted on the Imperial State Crown
The Samarian Spinel, the world's largest spinel
The Timur Ruby, believed to be a ruby until 1851, hence its name

Topazes
The American Golden Topaz, the largest cut yellow topaz, weighing nearly 23,000 carats (4.6 kg).
The Chalmers Topaz, a  cut topaz.

Images

See also
List of gold nuggets by size
List of minerals

References

External links
 Gemdat.org – The Gemstone Database
 Gemsociety.org - Gemstone Toxicity Table